Kamil Poźniak (born 11 December 1989, in Krasnystaw) is a Polish professional footballer who plays as a midfielder for Polish club Flota Świnoujście.

Career

Club
Poźniak made his professional debut for GKS Bełchatów in an Ekstraklasa match against Lech Poznań on 8 August 2008.

In February 2011, he signed five-year contract with Lechia Gdańsk.

International
He was a part of Poland national under-21 football team.

References

External links
 
 Kamil Poźniak at FuPa

1989 births
Living people
Polish footballers
Polish expatriate footballers
Poland under-21 international footballers
Avia Świdnik players
GKS Bełchatów players
Górnik Łęczna players
Lechia Gdańsk players
ŁKS Łódź players
Gwardia Koszalin players
Puszcza Niepołomice players
Motor Lublin players
Flota Świnoujście players
Ekstraklasa players
I liga players
II liga players
People from Krasnystaw
Sportspeople from Lublin Voivodeship
Association football midfielders
Polish expatriate sportspeople in Germany
Expatriate footballers in Germany